Emil Georgiev Kremenliev  (born 13 August 1969) is a Bulgarian former professional footballer who played as a right-back.

Career
Kremenliev played club football for Slavia Sofia, Levski Sofia, Olympiacos, again in Levski, CSKA Sofia, Union Berlin, Spartak Varna, Marek, Conegliano German and Kazichene. He left Union Berlin in January 2002.

Kremenliev was part of the Bulgaria national team that reached the semi-finals of the 1994 World Cup and also played at Euro 96. He was sent off against Mexico in the knockout round of the 1994 World Cup for yellow card accumulation.

Honours
Levski Sofia
 A PFG: 1993–94, 1994–95
 Bulgarian Cup: 1994CSKA Sofia A PFG: runner-up 1999–00
 Bulgarian Cup: 1999; runner-up 1998Slavia Sofia A PFG: runner-up 1989–90Union Berlin'''
 DFB-Pokal: runner-up 2000–01

References

External links

 Profile at LevskiSofia.info

1969 births
Living people
Footballers from Sofia
Bulgarian footballers
Association football defenders
Bulgaria international footballers
1994 FIFA World Cup players
UEFA Euro 1996 players
First Professional Football League (Bulgaria) players
2. Bundesliga players
Regionalliga players
PFC Slavia Sofia players
PFC Levski Sofia players
Olympiacos F.C. players
PFC CSKA Sofia players
1. FC Union Berlin players
PFC Spartak Varna players
PFC Marek Dupnitsa players
PFC Chernomorets Burgas Sofia players
Bulgarian expatriate footballers
Bulgarian expatriate sportspeople in Greece
Expatriate footballers in Greece
Bulgarian expatriate sportspeople in Germany
Expatriate footballers in Germany